Mary Ellen Toya (1934–1990) was a Jemez Pueblo potter of the Water Clan. She was active ca. 1950–1990, and was known for creating some of the largest Storyteller figures.

Family 
Mary Toya was married to Casimiro Toya, Sr. Their children are Melinda Toya Fragua, Mary Ellen Toya (M. Ellen Toya), Judy Toya, Marie Roberta Toya, Yolanda Toya, Casimiro Toya, Jr., Etta Toya Gachupin, and Anita Toya. She passed the pottery-making tradition onto her daughters.

Work 
Toya worked with matte polychrome, red and black-on-tan Storytellers, jars, bowls, plates, and wedding vases. Her favorite designs were kiva steps, terrace clouds, and cloud tracers.

Exhibits 
Toya, Mary E. and Toya, Anita. Traditional pit-fired Storytellers. April 1994. Bryans Gallery, Taos, New Mexico

Collections 
Toya, Mary E. Storyteller figure. Ceramic. Spurlock Museum of World Cultures, Urbana, Illinois

See also 

 List of Native American artists

References

Further reading 
 
 
 
 

1934 births
1990 deaths
American women ceramists
American ceramists
20th-century ceramists
20th-century American women
Native American potters